Karujaht Pärnumaal is the first Estonian narrative film 1914, directed by Johannes Pääsuke.

External links

1914 comedy films
Estonian black-and-white films
1914 films
Articles containing video clips
Silent films
Estonian comedy films